Attitude-behavior consistency is when a person's attitude is consistent with their behavior. This is not true in many cases. The fact that people often express attitudes that are inconsistent with how they act may surprise those unfamiliar with social and behavioral science, but it is an important fact to understand because facts are often reported as if they are about people's actions when they may only be known to be true about their words. It is often much easier to conduct interviews or surveys than to obtain records of how people behave in situations.  Sometimes attitudes, such as voting, are measurably consistent with behavior.  In such cases it may be possible to obtain accurate estimates of behavior. However, there is no general method for correcting for attitude-behavior inconsistency.

Applications to research methodology 
Attitude-behavior consistency is an important concept for social science research because claims are often made about behavior based on evidence which is really about attitudes. The attitudinal fallacy is committed when verbal data are used to support claims not about what people believe or say, but what they do.  Data collection methods based on self-report like surveys, and interviews   are vulnerable to the attitudinal fallacy if they attempt to measure behavior and if reported attitudes are inconsistent with the behavior.  

Research methods that directly observe behaviors avoid the attitudinal fallacy as a matter of course.  However many kinds of behavior are not easily observed. Ethnography can make rich observations and descriptions of behavior and allow for comparison between behavior and attitude. Unfortunately, in general ethnographic data cannot be used to draw statistically generalizable conclusions about behavior in a population. Ethnographers can still commit the attitudinal fallacy if they rely on quotations as evidence for behaviors. Experiments in laboratories make it possible to observe behavior, with the limitations that come from the laboratory situation. Internet research makes it possible to study a wide array of behaviors that leave traces online. Data from the Internet of things and sensors that record behavior like from location tracking may make it possible to measure more kinds of behavior that avoids the attitudinal fallacy. It may not be possible to study some kinds of behavior other than through interviews or surveys. While the knowledge produced in such cases may be useful.  The possibility of inconsistency between behavior and reported attitudes is always a concern.      

Methods that are limited by their inability to measure behavior can still contribute to important understandings. These include how meaning is created, the significance of events to individuals, emotion, semiotics, representation and opinions.

Examples 
 In the 1930s Richard LaPiere asked 251 hotel proprietors if they would serve Chinese guests and only 1 said yes. However, when he followed around a young Chinese couple that visited the hotels they were only denied service once.
 Americans on average report going to church twice as much as they actually do. But Europeans accurately self-report church attendance.
 Although most employers in an audit study reported that they were willing to give job interviews to young male black ex-offenders, they were unlikely to provide interviews when presented with opportunities to interview men appearing to be so.
 People in health studies where they are asked to report how much food they eat tend to report eating less than they actually do.
Observing bystander effect in a naturalistic setting results in behavior that is consistent as per the classic bystander effect. However, if the same effect were to be done with surveys, one will get a very different results.

Ways attitudes and behaviors can be different

Social desirability 
  

Reports of attitudes and behaviors may be subject to social desirability bias. Even in cases where respondents are anonymous, people may be less likely to acknowledge  behaviors that they see as undesirable. Conversely they may be more likely to report behaviors that are seen as more desirable.  Social desirability bias results from inconsistency between attitudes and behaviors. This is because although people may have positive attitudes toward behaviors they see as desirable, they do not actually perform the behaviors as often as they say they do. Studies making claims about behaviors based on reports when behaviors may be seen as desirable may be particularly sensitive to the attitudinal fallacy. Although indirect questioning has been a common practice among survey researchers, it is not generally effective at mitigating social desirability bias. 

People do not necessarily agree on which attitudes are socially desirable. Moreover, these attitudes may be situational (see below) and vary from setting to setting. Therefore, the ways in which attitudes are biased by social desirability may be interesting in its own right. Therefore, social desirability may not invalidate measures of internal factors such as personality in the same way as it invalidates studies of behavior.

Attitudes and behaviors are situational  
A person's attitude and behavior both vary from situation to situation.  Behaviors may vary as when a person who rarely edits Wikipedia does so for a class assignment. Attitudes also vary from situation to situation. A college freshman may disapprove of binge drinking, only to subsequently become socialized to practice and celebrate doing so in the course of tailgating.  Sometimes attitudes and behavior may be linked to reduce cognitive dissonance. But this need not be the case.

Consciousness 
An initial impression can be formed much more easily than attitudes about an attitude object can be changed. So called "below conscious awareness" is much more likely to influence an initial impression than effect change.

See also
Value-action gap

References 

Behavior
Psychological attitude
Psychological theories
Qualitative research
Social science methodology
Sociological theories
Survey methodology